Barsov (from барс meaning leopard) is a Russian masculine surname, its feminine counterpart is Barsova. It may refer to:

Nickname of Georgian communist Mikhail Tskhakaya (1865–1950)
Alexei Barsov (born 1966), Uzbekistani chess grandmaster
Elpidifor Barsov (1836–1917), Russian literary historian, ethnographer, folklorist, archeologist and philologist
Maksim Barsov (born 1993), Russian football forward
Valeria Barsova (1892–1967), Russian operatic soprano

Russian-language surnames